Joan Valerie Hall, CBE (born 31 August 1935) is a British former Conservative Party politician and secretary.

Education 
Hall was educated at Queen Margaret's School, York.

Career 
At the 1970 general election she was elected Member of Parliament (MP) for the marginal seat of Keighley with a majority of 616 votes, becoming its first female MP. However, at the February 1974 election, she lost by 878 votes to the Labour candidate, Bob Cryer.

She served as PPS to Anthony Stodart, Minister of State at the Ministry of Agriculture.

She was a staunch supporter of Margaret Thatcher in her battle with Edward Heath for the leadership of the Conservative Party, and acted as Thatcher's chauffeur.

References 

Times Guide to the House of Commons February 1974

External links 
 

1935 births
Living people
Conservative Party (UK) MPs for English constituencies
People educated at Queen Margaret's School, York
Female members of the Parliament of the United Kingdom for English constituencies
UK MPs 1970–1974
Commanders of the Order of the British Empire
20th-century British women politicians
20th-century English women
20th-century English people